Sir Edward Abdy Fellowes,  (23 June 189528 December 1970) was an official of the Parliament of the United Kingdom and a former British Army officer who saw active service during World War I. He served as Clerk of the House of Commons from 1954 to 1961.

Early life
Fellowes was born in London, England, on 23 June 1895. He was the eldest son of William Gordon Fellowes, a barrister, and his wife, Marian Augusta Fellowes (née Hamilton). He was educated at Marlborough College, then a boys private school in Marlborough, Wiltshire. In 1914, he was offered a place at Merton College, Oxford. However, with the outbreak of World War I, he joined the British Army rather than attend the University of Oxford.

Career

Military service
On 19 November 1914, he was granted a commission as a temporary second lieutenant. On 15 March 1917, he was transferred to the training reserve and granted seniority in the rank of temporary lieutenant from 27 December 1915. On 4 May 1917, he was transferred from the training reserve to the Royal West Surrey Regiment. On 2 June 1917, he was promoted to temporary captain. On 6 September 1918, he was appointed adjutant of a service battalion of the Royal West Surrey Regiment.

During World War I, Fellowes saw active service with the British Army on the Western Front. As was common for those serving in the trenches, he spent some time in hospital being treated for gas poisoning following a mustard gas attack.

Parliamentary career
Fellowes Fellowes returned from the war a decorated officer but did not take up his university place. Instead, in 1919, he joined the clerkship of the House of Commons. He held the appointment of Assistant Clerk to the House from 1919 to 1937. On 31 July 1937, he was appointed Second Clerk Assistant of the House of Commons. On 3 August 1954, he was appointed Clerk of the House of Commons, succeeding Sir Frederic Metcalfe.

Honours and decorations
In September 1917, Fellowes was awarded the Military Cross (MC) for service during World War I. He was also a recipient of the "Pip, Squeak and Wilfred" service medals; the 1914–15 Star, the British War Medal, and the Victory Medal.

In the 1945 New Year Honours, Fellowes was appointed Companion of the Order of the Bath (CB) in recognition of his service as Second Clerk Assistant. In 1953, he was appointed Companion of the Order of St Michael and St George (CMG). In the 1955 New Year Honours, he was promoted to Knight Commander of the Order of the Bath (KCB) for his service as Clerk of the House of Commons.

References

 

 
 
 

1895 births
1970 deaths
Clerks of the House of Commons
Recipients of the Military Cross
Knights Commander of the Order of the Bath
Companions of the Order of St Michael and St George
Military personnel from London
People educated at Marlborough College